The 80th Separate Air Assault Brigade (Military Unit Number A0284) is an airmobile formation of the Ukrainian Air Assault Forces. The brigade traces its history back to the 80th Airborne Regiment of the Soviet Union, formed in 1955 as part of the Soviet airborne's 7th Guards Airborne Division. Four years later, the regiment transferred to the 104th Guards Airborne Division. It participated in Operation Whirlwind in 1956 and Operation Danube in 1968. In 1979, the regiment was disbanded and used to form the 39th and 40th Separate Air Assault Brigades of the Soviet Army. The 39th Separate Air Assault Brigade became the 224th Training Center after transfer back to the Soviet airborne in 1990. The training center was taken over by Ukraine in 1992 with the dissolution of the Soviet Union and became the 6th Separate Airmobile Brigade in 1995. In 1999, the brigade was reorganized into the 80th Airmobile Regiment, part of the 13th Army Corps. In 2013, the regiment was upgraded and became a brigade. The brigade fought in the War in Donbass, and was redesignated as an air assault brigade in 2015.

History

80th Airborne Regiment 
The 80th Airborne Regiment was formed on 3 May 1955 in the Lithuanian SSR, the only non-Guards Soviet airborne regiment. The regiment celebrates its anniversary on 19 December. It originally formed part of the 7th Guards Airborne Division of the Soviet Airborne Forces at Gaižiūnai. The regiment fought in Operation Whirlwind, the Soviet invasion of Hungary, and landed in Budapest on 4 November 1956. In 1959, it transferred to the 104th Guards Airborne Division and was based in Baku. On 22 February 1968, for its achievements in training, the Regiment was awarded the Order of the Red Star. Division headquarters was at Kirovabad (now Gyandzha) in the Azerbaijan SSR. Carey Schofield writes that the 104th Guards Airborne Division "had only two regiments from 1975 to 1980 after the disbandment of the 80th Guards Airborne Regiment in Baku". In August 1968, the regiment participated in Operation Danube, the crushing of the Prague Spring.

39th Separate Air Assault Brigade 
On 3 August 1979, the regiment was disbanded. The 39th Separate Air Assault Brigade was formed from elements of the regiment at Khyriv in Lviv Oblast on 19 December. The 40th Separate Air Assault Brigade was formed in Mykolaiv from other parts of the regiment. In January 1980, the 1st Battalion of the 39th Separate Air Assault Brigade was deployed to Termez for fighting in the Soviet–Afghan War and became the 48th Separate Air Assault Battalion. The battalion was absorbed by the 66th Separate Motor Rifle Brigade in May. In 1986, the 39th Brigade participated in the Chernobyl cleanup. Between January and April 1990, the 39th Separate Air Assault Brigade was deployed to restore order in during the first Nagorno-Karabakh War.

1990s 
In June 1990 the 39th Separate Air Assault Brigade became the 224th Training Center of the Soviet Airborne Forces. The brigade included the 1st and 2nd Airborne Training Battalions, as well as an artillery training battalion. In May 1992 the training center became part of the Ukrainian Armed Forces. In September 1993, the 224th Training Center was renamed the 39th Separate Airborne Brigade. It became the 6th Separate Airmobile Brigade on 1 November 1995. The brigade participated in Exercise Peaceshield in 1995 and 1996. In December 1999, the brigade was reorganized into the 80th Airmobile Regiment.

80th Airmobile Regiment 

In July 2000, the regiment participated in Exercise Peaceshield 2000 with US troops and forces from other countries. In April 2003, the regiment was moved to Lviv. In 2004, the regiment was scheduled to be sent to Iraq as part of the Ukrainian contingent there. An airmobile battalion, mortar batteries, an engineer platoon, a chemical defense platoon, communications company and military police company were drawn from the regiment and deployed to Iraq on 15 May 2005 as the 81st Tactical Group. The troops were part of Multinational Division Central-South and were withdrawn at the end of the year, the last Ukrainian unit in Iraq. In 2006, the regiment contributed troops to the Kosovo Force UkrPolBat joint Ukrainian-Polish peacekeeping battalion.

A mortar barrel rupture during a tactical exercise of the regiment's 1st mortar battery mortally wounded four soldiers on 6 August 2008. On 27 May 2010, the regiment was visited by then-President Viktor Yanukovych.

80th Airmobile Brigade 

On 25 November 2013, the regiment became the 80th Airmobile Brigade. In the spring of 2014, after the Annexation of Crimea by the Russian Federation, the brigade covered the Ukraine–Russia border in Poltava and Sumy Oblasts. Between 7–8 April 2014, the brigade relocated to defend the Luhansk Airport. The brigade defended the airport until September, when a Russian attack forced them to retreat. The brigade fought in the battle for Shchastia in June 2014. During a night battle on 17–18 June, 11 personnel from the brigade and the 128th Mountain Brigade were killed. On 1 August, the brigade ambushed a separatist column moving from Sukhodolska to Luhansk, destroying seven tanks, five armored vehicles, 3 BM-21 Grad MLRS, seven cars with ammunition and killing 120–150 separatists. On 28 October, seven brigade personnel were released from captivity by the separatists.

The brigade's 3rd Battalion fought in the Second Battle of Donetsk Airport in January 2015. The unit became known as the "Cyborgs" along with other Ukrainian units defending Donetsk Airport. Along with the 90th Separate Airborne Battalion of the 81st Airmobile Brigade, the unit was forced to retreat from the new airport terminal, reportedly under heavy artillery fire and chemical attack. Over 50 soldiers from both units died in the fighting between 19 and 21 January. After the Ukrainian withdrawal from the airport on 21 January, at least 15 soldiers from the brigade were captured by the separatists. Several of the soldiers were subjected to frequent beatings.

Since at least May 2015, the brigade has been equipped with 28 M1114 Up-Armored Humvees.

80th Air Assault Brigade 

On 24 August 2015, President Petro Poroshenko presented the brigade a battle flag for bravery and courage during a review in Kyiv on the 24th anniversary of Ukrainian independence; by this time, it had been redesignated as the 80th Separate Air Assault Brigade. Brigade Junior sergeant and medic Igor Zinych was posthumously awarded the title Hero of Ukraine on 14 October for his actions in caring for the wounded at Donetsk Airport. On 18 November 2015, the brigade's Order of the Red Star award was removed as part of a general removal of Soviet awards and decorations from Ukrainian military units. In June 2016, a platoon of the brigade participated in the multinational Anakonda 16 exercise at Nowa Dęba training ground, attached to a Polish battalion. In August 2016, the brigade's mortar platoon and some of its staff officers participated in the multinational Flaming Thunder exercises Pabradė Training Area in Lithuania. On 23 August, former brigade commander Andriy Kovalchuk was awarded the titile Hero of Ukraine for his leadership.

As of June 2017, elements of the brigade, equipped with Humvees, defended positions at Pisky, near Donetsk Airport. On 2 August, brigade commander Colonel Volodymyr Shvorak stated that the losses of the brigade in the Donbass amounted to 104 killed, seven missing, and 542 wounded, most of which were suffered during the defense of the Luhansk airport in late 2014.

The brigade took part in the defense of Ukraine during the 2022 Russian invasion of Ukraine, fighting around Voznesensk.

By September 2022, elements of the brigade were also identified via social media posts to be taking part in the southern counteroffensive.

Members of the brigade were seen reaching the outskirts of Kupiansk alongside SBU Alpha Group, 92nd Mechanized Brigade, and the 25th Airborne Brigade. That same day, the Kyiv Post announced the liberation of the city, despite the Ukrainian Armed Forces operational silence.  The UK Ministry of Defence commented, suggesting that the capture of the city dealt a "significant blow" due to Russian supply nodes routing to the Donbas region.

In February 2023 the brigade took part in the Battle of Bakhmut.

Deployments
Soldiers from the brigade have served in Afghanistan, Nagorno-Karabakh, Kosovo, Sierra Leone, and Iraq.

Structure
As of 2022 the brigade's structure is as follows:
 80th Air Assault Brigade, Lviv
 Headquarters & Headquarters Company
 1st Air Assault Battalion
 2nd Air Assault Battalion
 87th Separate Airmobile Battalion (Formed in 2013 in Chernivtsi on the basis of 300th Mechanized Regiment).
 Tank Company
 Reconnaissance Company
 Artillery Group (Brigade artillery group equipped with 2S1 self-propelled artillery vehicles).
 Anti-Aircraft Company
 Support units (This includes all rear elements such as engineers, communication, medics, and material support unit).

Past commanders
 Colonel Ihor Overin – 2005
 Lieutenant Colonel (later Colonel) Viktor Kopachynskii (2008March 2015)
 Colonel Andrei Kovalchuk (2015March 2016)
 Colonel Volodymyr Shvorak (2016–N/A)
 Col. Ihor Skybyuk (N/A-present)

References

 

Airmobile brigades
Military units and formations established in 2013
Brigades of the Ukrainian Air Assault Forces